Ron Thulin is a sportscaster who currently works for Stadium (sports network) and Fox Sports Net. He was formerly with Turner Sports.

Biography
Thulin has called play-by-play for college football coverage on TBS, FOX, Stadium and American sports network. He has been part of 5 Olympic broadcasts, including alpine events for Turner Sports, and International Broadcasts in Vancouver. He called gymnastics in London Summer Olympic Games along with men’s and women’s basketball and trampoline.
In 1989 he joined Turner Broadcasting as play-by- play for the Atlanta Hawks. The following year he began PxP for the NBA on TBS/TNT.
He was also handled PxP for the San Antonio Spurs in 1996-97.
During his 4 decade career, Thulin has also called college basketball for Raycom Sports, FOX, ESPN 3 and ESPN plus. 
While at Turner, Thulin also was the lead PxP guy for basketball the Goodwill games in Seattle and St Petersburg Russia. Also handled PxP for the Pan Am Games in Havana Cuba for both TNT and ABC sports.
In 2017 he began play by play for the Dallas Wings of the WNBA. In 2020, he called the league for CBS Sports network. 
Along with his play by play duties, he has hosted numerous shows including ESPN road show for 3 years.
His career started in 1976 at WKY TV in Oklahoma City as a sports anchor. During his time there, he also hosted the Barry Switzer Show
In 1982, Thulin became the weekend anchor at KXAS in Dallas, Texas.
Also had a role in the movie “Tex” playing a TV anchor.

Personal life
Thulin resides in the DFW area with his wife Paula. They have 2 daughters Katie and Joanna and one grand son, Jack. He is a graduate of Southern Nazarene University. He is active in FCA.

External links
 TBS bio
 

Year of birth missing (living people)
Living people
American television sports announcers
Atlanta Falcons announcers
Atlanta Hawks announcers
Atlanta Thrashers announcers
College basketball announcers in the United States
College football announcers
High school football announcers in the United States
National Football League announcers
National Basketball Association broadcasters
National Hockey League broadcasters
Olympic Games broadcasters
Southern Nazarene University alumni
Sportspeople from Dallas
Women's National Basketball Association announcers